Owren is a surname. Notable people with the surname include:

Michael Owren (1955–2014), Norwegian-born American psychologist
Sidsel Owren, Norwegian ski-orienteering competitor
Trygve Owren (1912–1987), Norwegian politician

See also
Oren
Owen (name)